Dominic Vicari (born October 30, 1984) is an American former professional ice hockey goaltender.

Prior to turning professional, Vicari attended Michigan State University (MSU) where he played three seasons (2003 – 2006) of NCAA Men's Division I Ice Hockey with the Michigan State Spartans. In his freshman year, Vicari was recognized for his outstanding college hockey play when he was named to the 2003–04 CCHA All-Rookie First Team, and was also selected the CCHA Goaltender of the Year.

Forgoing his final year of NCAA eligibility, Vicari signed with the Toledo Storm to play the 2006–07 season in the ECHL. On January 23, 2007, Vicari was signed to professional tryout contract by Grand Rapids Griffins, but played in just one game with the American Hockey League team.

Awards and honors

References

External links

1984 births
Living people
American men's ice hockey goaltenders
Grand Rapids Griffins players
Michigan State Spartans men's ice hockey players
Omaha Lancers players
River City Lancers players
Toledo Storm players
Ice hockey players from Michigan
People from Clinton, Macomb County, Michigan
Sportspeople from Metro Detroit